Hodges Figgis is a long-operating bookshop in central Dublin, Ireland. Founded in 1768, it is probably the third-oldest functioning bookstore in the world, after the Livraria Bertrand of Lisbon (1732) and Pennsylvania's Moravian Book Shop (1745).  It was moved and expanded numerous times, and assumed its current form, at 56-58 Dawson Street, in 1992, operating continuously over three storeys-over-basement since then. It is mentioned in James Joyce's modernist novel Ulysses, at the time of which it would have been situated at 104 Grafton Street, and the novel Conversations with Friends" by Sally Rooney, and in other writings.  Since 2011, it has been owned and operated by Waterstones, who regards it as an integral bookstore and provides it with considerable autonomy.  It celebrated its 250th anniversary with publication of an anthology of modern Irish writing with 250 contributors.

History

18th and 19th centuries
The bookshop was opened in 1768 at 10 Skinner's Row, near Christ Church Cathedral, by a John Milliken, son of a local property owner. Milliken moved it to 32 Grafton Street in 1797, and in 1819 the Milliken family moved to 104 Grafton Street, where it operated for over a century. The shop's records note that in 1822, proprietor Richard Milliken stood with his 22 daughters on the shop's balcony for a royal visit by George IV.  Following financial problems, the shop, run by Andrew Milliken since 1834, was taken over by Hodges and Smith, booksellers of College Green since the 1760s. Hodges and Smith also published books, notably including works of Irish interest.  The business published for more than a hundred years thereafter.

After the death of George Smith, a new operating partnership saw it become Hodges, Foster & Co., then a further new partnership with an employee, Samuel Figgis, led to it becoming Hodges, Figgis & Co.  Hodges, Figgis & Co., Limited was registered as a company in 1892, when Samuel Figgis was sole proprietor following a retirement.  A son of Samuel Figgis, William Fernsley Figgis, led the next generation of the shop, alongside Samuel's successor as managing director, Thomas Brown.

20th and 21st centuries
The impact of building works and wartime absence led to a financial restructuring in 1920, which saw the business surrender its premises and move to 20 Nassau Street.  In 1945, it moved again, to 6 Dawson Street.  Allen Figgis assumed control as owner and managing director in 1956, and expanded the shop into neighbouring premises at 7 Dawson Street. A paperback-specialised branch was opened in Suffolk Street, and publishing operations grew, with a notable release in 1968 of an Encyclopedia of Ireland.  The shop also hosted major book launches, including that of a special edition of the Táin Bó Cúailnge illustrated by Louis le Brocquy.  A bicentennial event was held in 1968, marked by the release of a 1,700-volume Celtic Studies catalogue at a reception attended by Archbishop and scholar George Simms, and Allen and Francis, and Neville, Figgis.

In 1974 the shop was moved to St Stephen's Green.  A warehouse was established in Donnybrook, and branches were opened in Donnybrook and Dún Laoghaire in the Dublin hinterland, and in Kilkenny and Cork.  University bookshops were also added, at the University College Dublin (UCD) Belfield campus, and at University College Cork (UCC) and University College Galway (UCG).  By 1977, the business had achieved a turnover of 800,000 Irish pounds, and a net profit of 30,000.

In 1978, Allen Figgis sold the chain, then comprising the main shop at St Stephen's Green, and branches at Donnybrook, Dun Laoghaire and UCD, to Pentos, who owned the UK Dillons the Bookstore chain, for 132,000 Irish pounds.  Hodges Figgis took over the lease of 56 Dawson Street, the former Browne and Nolan bookshop, in 1979, for university, library supplies and Celtic studies sales, and eventually schoolbooks also.  The UCD branch was closed, and Kilkenny and Cork outlets purchased.  By 1981 all operations had moved to Dawson Street. 

Having moved to 57-58 Dawson Street, in 1992 the company re-acquired the lease on the 56 Dawson Street location.  In 1995, Pentos went into receivership and its businesses, Dillons, including Hodges Figgis, and office stationery and furniture operations, were put up for sale.  It was indicated that the Hodges Figgis and its branch at Dublin City University might be available to buy separately.  In the end, the bookselling business was sold to Thorn EMI, and the Dawson Street shop closed for four hours for formal reasons, the only official disruption to trade in over 200 years.  EMI merged the Waterstones and Hodges Figgis bookselling businesses with music retailer HMV, but then demerged them in 2011, selling Waterstones including Hodges Figgis to company controlled by Russian businessman Alexander Mamut for around 53 million pounds. Mamut's companies sold its book-selling interests as Waterstones including Hodges Figgis, Hatchards and Foyles, to a unit of hedge fund Elliott in 2018, and the fund in turn bought Barnes and Noble the following year, placing the US chain under the Waterstones CEO but otherwise segregated.

The shop briefly housed a coffee shop on the first floor, but this was removed during renovations in 2002, to expand the space available for book display and sale. Hodges Figgis has a long-running mail order business, as well as an account sales (library and corporate) department.

Waterstones
Hodges Figgis remains owned by UK bookseller chain Waterstones. The shop operates as an integral part of the Waterstones group, with the exception of operating its own loyalty stamp scheme instead of the Waterstones Plus card.  In line with Waterstones operating strategy, it has considerable autonomy in buying and presentation, as confirmed by the group CEO. It was the second highest performing store in the chain in 2015 and 2018 only outstripped by the flagship Waterstones store in Piccadilly.  As of 2018 the shop typically stocked around a million volumes, with about 70,000 titles, more than 5 times the range of a typical high street bookshop, over three storeys and a basement.  The shop specialises in Irish interest titles, and has a large academic section.

Hodges Figgis also operate the part-time student bookshop in Dublin City University. Waterstones operate two others shops in Ireland, having closed their other Dublin stores – which included one directly opposite Hodges Figgis – in 2011. As of 2022, the other shops are in Cork and Drogheda.

Recognition and popular culture
Hodges Figgis has been mentioned in The New York Times and The Wall Street Journal, as well as in popular works of fiction such as Sally Rooney's "Conversations with Friends" and John Boyne's The Heart's Invisible Furies and a poem by Paul Durcan.

A volume of new writing by contemporary Irish writers, with an appendix on the shop's history, was published to commemorate Hodges Figgis's 250th anniversary in 2018, with the proceeds going to charitable literacy works. It featured a wide variety of forms, by 250 authors, playwrights and poets, over more than 700 pages, and cover artwork by Pauline Bewick; all contributors, and the editor, gave their gave their efforts at no charge.

See also
Hodges Figgis Trophy

References

External links
 Official website

Bookstores established in the 18th century
Bookstores of Ireland
Retail companies established in 1768
Shops in Dublin (city)
1768 establishments in Ireland